Priyank Tatariya (born 29 July 1981) is an Indian model and actor. He started his career as a model and appeared in commercials for Acer, Center Fresh and others. He wrote and directed the 2014 Indian Gujarati short film Ravla and acted in the 2015 short film End Topic. In 2017, he started appearing in the leadrole of Mehul Parekh in the Star Plus television series Ikyawann. He is of Gujarati descent.

Filmography

References

External links

1981 births
Living people
Indian male models
Indian male television actors
Indian male film actors
Male actors in Hindi television
Gujarati people
Male actors from New York City
Male actors from Gujarat